Olympia is the thirteenth studio album by English singer Bryan Ferry, released on 25 October 2010 by Virgin Records. Co-produced by Ferry and Rhett Davies, Olympia is Ferry's first album of predominantly original material since 2002's Frantic.

The album features a wide range of contributors, including co-songwriter David A. Stewart of Eurythmics, Brian Eno, Phil Manzanera and Andy Mackay of Roxy Music, the electronic group Groove Armada, David Gilmour, Marcus Miller, Scissor Sisters, Nile Rodgers, Jonny Greenwood of Radiohead, Steve Nieve, and Flea.  Early in the recording process Olympia was developed as a Roxy Music project, the first since the band's 1982 album Avalon, with participation from numerous guests. However, despite the presence of other Roxy Music members at the sessions, it was released as a Bryan Ferry solo project.

The album peaked at number 19 on the UK Albums Chart.

Background
The album features some songs previously recorded by Ferry in collaborations with other artists. "You Can Dance", a version of which appeared as "U Can Dance" on DJ Hell's 2009 album Teufelswerk, is the record's first single. A version of "Shameless" previously appeared as a collaboration with Groove Armada on their album Black Light earlier in 2010. The album also features covers of Tim Buckley's "Song to the Siren" and Traffic's "No Face, No Name, No Number." The album came out in three versions: a standard edition with 10 songs, the "Deluxe Edition" containing two additional tracks and a DVD featuring "The Making of Olympia" documentary and a promo video for the song "You Can Dance", and the "Collector's Edition" with the 12 tracks and DVD from the Deluxe Edition as well as a second CD containing remixes and a 40-page hardback book.

In 2011 the single "Alphaville" was sent to a number of radio stations and appeared on BBC Radio 2's playlist and 106.9FM WHCR's

The album art features the fashion model Kate Moss and refers to the Édouard Manet 1863 painting of the same name.

Critical reception
Reviewing for AllMusic, Stephen Thomas Erlewine wrote of the album "Such command of mood is a tell-tale sign of a quiet perfectionist, but Olympia doesn't feel fussy; it's unruffled and casually elegant, its pleasing familiarity reflecting the persistence of an old master honing his craft." And reviewing for Rolling Stone, Jon Dolan wrote of the album "Ferry could do a record with the Star Wars cantina band and it would come out pretty much the same: a bunch of lush, languorous Euro-glam ballads about love's labour's lost, all of them slathered in a sexy-vampire croon that makes lines about being 'faithfully entwined in a shameless world' seem like some deep shit."

Track listing

Personnel

Musicians

 Bryan Ferry – vocals, keyboards, acoustic piano (1-9, 11, 12)
 Colin Good – keyboards (2), synthesizers (6)
 Brian Eno – synthesizers (2, 4, 6, 8)
 Babydaddy – keyboards (3), guitars (3), bass (3)
 Steve Nieve – acoustic piano (10)
 Robin "Radar" Rimbaud – electronics (1, 10)
 Chris Mullings – electronics (2, 3)
 John Monkman – electronics (4-9, 11, 12)
 Nile Rodgers – guitars (1, 5, 10)
 Oliver Thompson – guitars (1, 5, 10)
 David Williams – guitars (1, 5, 10)
 Neil Hubbard – guitars (2, 12)
 David A. Stewart – guitars (2)
 David Gilmour – guitars (4, 6)
 Jonny Greenwood – guitars (6)
 Phil Manzanera – guitars (6, 8, 9, 11)
 Chris Spedding – guitars (7, 8, 11)
 Merlin Ferry – guitars (9)
 Flea – bass (1, 7, 11), bass solo (3)
 Gary "Mani" Mounfield – bass (1, 8)
 Marcus Miller – bass (2, 4, 6, 9, 10, 12)
 Guy Pratt – bass (11)
 Andy Cato – bass (5)
 Tara Ferry – drums (1, 3, 4, 5, 8, 10, 11)
 Andy Newmark – drums (1, 3, 4, 5, 8, 10, 11)
 Emily Dolan Davies – drums (2, 6, 7, 9)
 Steve Ferrone – drums (12)
 Frank Ricotti – percussion
 Anthony Pleeth – cello (2, 4, 6, 7)
 Vicci Wardman – viola (2, 4, 6, 7)
 Perry Montague-Mason – 1st violin (2, 4, 6, 7)
 Emlyn Singleton – 2nd violin (2, 4, 6, 7)
 Andy Mackay – oboe (3, 6, 11)
 Alice Retif – chorus vocals (1, 2)
 Katie Turner – chorus vocals (1)
 Ruby Turner – chorus vocals (2, 3, 11)
 Me'sha Bryan – chorus vocals (3, 11)
 Thomas Fetherstonhaugh – treble vocals (3)
 Sewuese Abwa – chorus vocals (4, 6-10, 12)
 Aleysha Gordon – chorus vocals (4, 6-10, 12)
 Hannah Khemoh – chorus vocals (4, 6-10, 12)
 Shar White – chorus vocals (5, 11)
 Tallulah Harlech – voice (6, 9)
 Jhelisa Anderson – chorus vocals (11)

Technical

 Bryan Ferry – producer
 Rhett Davies – producer
 Johnson Somerset – producer
 David A. Stewart – additional producer (2)
 Babydaddy – additional producer (3)
 Jake Shears – additional producer (3)
 Groove Armada – additional producers (5)
 Phil Manzanera – additional producer (8)
 John Monkman – additional producer (8), additional engineer
 Robin Trower – additional producer (11, 12)
 Simon Willey – engineer
 Ash Howes – additional engineer
 Jamie Johnson – additional engineer
 Tim Roe – additional engineer
 Sven Taits – additional engineer
 Chris Mullings – additional recording
 Bob Clearmountain – mixing
 Bob Ludwig – mastering

Artwork
 Bryan Ferry – art direction
 Isaac Ferry – artwork production
 Gideon Ponte – set design 
 Chris Peyton – layout 
 Jono Patrick – digital artwork
 Adam Whitehead – photography
 Anton Corbijn – portrait of Bryan Ferry
 Richard Williams – liner notes
 Kate Moss – cover model

Charts

Notes

References

2010 albums
Albums produced by Rhett Davies
Bryan Ferry albums
Virgin Records albums